Martin Bartek (born July 17, 1980) is a Slovak former professional ice hockey player. He last played for HC 07 Detva in the Slovak Extraliga.

Bartek previously played for HKm Zvolen, New Orleans Brass, Milwaukee Admirals, Cincinnati Cyclones, HC Hamé Zlín, Pensacola Ice Pilots, Richmond Renegades, Louisiana IceGators, Lukko Rauma, Metallurg Novokuznetsk, EV Duisburg, Leksands IF and HC Slovan Bratislava.

Career statistics

Regular season and playoffs

References

External links

1980 births
Living people
Cincinnati Cyclones (ECHL) players
Essen Mosquitoes players
ETC Crimmitschau players
Füchse Duisburg players
HC Bílí Tygři Liberec players
HC 07 Detva players
HC Dynamo Pardubice players
HC Karlovy Vary players
HC Slovan Bratislava players
PSG Berani Zlín players
HKM Zvolen players
Kassel Huskies players
Kölner Haie players
Leksands IF players
Louisiana IceGators (ECHL) players
Lukko players
Metallurg Magnitogorsk players
Milwaukee Admirals players
Milwaukee Admirals (IHL) players
Moncton Wildcats players
Nashville Predators draft picks
New Orleans Brass players
Pensacola Ice Pilots players
Richmond Renegades players
Rimouski Océanic players
Rouyn-Noranda Huskies players
Sherbrooke Faucons players
Slovak ice hockey forwards
Sportspeople from Zvolen
Slovak expatriate ice hockey players in Canada
Slovak expatriate ice hockey players in the United States
Slovak expatriate ice hockey players in the Czech Republic
Slovak expatriate ice hockey players in Finland
Slovak expatriate ice hockey players in Germany
Slovak expatriate ice hockey players in Sweden
Slovak expatriate ice hockey players in Russia